Banashankari is a metro station on the Green Line of the Namma Metro serving the Sarbandapalya area of Bangalore, India. It was opened to the public on 18 June 2017.

History

Station layout

Gallery 
Banashankari metro station:-

Connections
The station is also connected to the BMTC Banashankari Bus Station and the Sri Banashankari Amma Temple.

Entry/Exits

See also

References

External links

 Bangalore Metro Rail Corporation Ltd. (Official site) 
 UrbanRail.Net – descriptions of all metro systems in the world, each with a schematic map showing all stations.

Namma Metro stations
Railway stations in India opened in 2017
2017 establishments in Karnataka
Railway stations in Bangalore